Hucisko Nienadowskie  is a village in the administrative district of Gmina Dubiecko, within Przemyśl County, Subcarpathian Voivodeship, in south-eastern Poland.

The village has a population of 554.

References

Hucisko Nienadowskie